Tatyana Nikolayevna  Moskalkova (born May 30, 1955, Vitebsk, Byelorussian SSR, USSR) is a Russian lawyer, teacher, and politician. She has been Russia's Commissioner for Human Rights since 22 April 2016, succeeding Ella Pamfilova, and is the Deputy of the State Duma of the Federal Assembly of the Russian Federation V and VI convocations.

Moskalkova holds a Doctor of Law and PhD, and is an Honoured Lawyer of Russia. She is a retired Major-General in the police.

Moskalkova is known for her pro-Kremlin stance. She has condemned the Pussy Riot movement as "an attack against morality" and is critical towards the West.

References

External links

 Сайт Уполномоченного по правам человека в Российской Федерации
 Татьяна Москалькова на сайте Государственной Думы

1955 births
Living people
Recipients of the Order of Honour (Russia)
A Just Russia politicians
21st-century Russian politicians
People from Vitebsk
Ombudsmen in Russia
21st-century Russian women politicians
Fifth convocation members of the State Duma (Russian Federation)
Sixth convocation members of the State Duma (Russian Federation)
Kutafin Moscow State Law University alumni